Ashith Rajiv (born 26 March 1993) is an Indian cricketer. He made his List A debut for Puducherry in the 2018–19 Vijay Hazare Trophy on 19 September 2018. He made his Twenty20 debut on 9 November 2019, for Meghalaya in the 2019–20 Syed Mushtaq Ali Trophy. He made his first-class debut on 9 December 2019, for Puducherry in the 2019–20 Ranji Trophy.

References

External links
 

1993 births
Living people
Indian cricketers
Pondicherry cricketers
Place of birth missing (living people)